William "Chip" Banks (born September 18, 1959) is a former All-Pro professional American football linebacker.

High school and college career
Banks graduated from Lucy Craft Laney High School in Augusta, Georgia. He played college football at the University of Southern California (USC), from which he graduated in 1981.

Professional career
Banks was drafted by the Cleveland Browns with the third overall pick in the 1982 NFL Draft. He was awarded the NFL Rookie of the Year Award and was a four-time AFC Pro Bowler (1982, 1983, 1985, 1986) with the Cleveland Browns. Banks was traded to the San Diego Chargers on April 28, 1987 as part of a deal that saw the Browns and Chargers swap first- and second-round selections in the 1987 NFL Draft. Banks expected to get a new contract from San Diego and when the Chargers demanded he play out his under-market deal from Cleveland, Banks angrily refused to report again and sat out the entire 1988 season. He was traded to the Indianapolis Colts and played there for four seasons before retiring after the 1992 season.

NFL statistics

References

External links
 

1959 births
Living people
African-American players of American football
American football linebackers
Cleveland Browns players
Indianapolis Colts players
San Diego Chargers players
USC Trojans football players
American Conference Pro Bowl players
National Football League Defensive Rookie of the Year Award winners
Sportspeople from Lawton, Oklahoma
Players of American football from Augusta, Georgia
Ed Block Courage Award recipients